Agh Bolagh (also Romanized as Āgh Bolāgh; also known as Āgh Bolāq and Āqbolāgh Kānasbī) is a village in Dasht-e Bil Rural District of the Central District of Oshnavieh County, West Azerbaijan province, Iran. At the 2006 National Census, its population was 1,158 in 301 households. The following census in 2011 counted 1,274 people in 341 households. The latest census in 2016 showed a population of 1,295 people in 357 households; it was the largest village in its rural district.

References 

Oshnavieh County

Populated places in West Azerbaijan Province

Populated places in Oshnavieh County